Cutler Stack is a conspicuous sea stack extending  and rising to , lying off Ivanov Beach in the south of Barclay Bay, western Livingston Island in the South Shetland Islands, Antarctica. The area was visited by early 19th century sealers.

The feature is named after Captain Benjamin Cutler, part owner of the American brig Frederick that visited the area in 1820–21, and Master of the sealing schooner Free Gift that visited the area in 1821–22; his name was found carved on a piece of whale vertebra excavated from a stone hut on Byers Peninsula by a FIDS survey party in 1957–58.

Location

See also 
 Composite Antarctic Gazetteer
 List of Antarctic islands south of 60° S
 SCAR
 Territorial claims in Antarctica

Maps
 Península Byers, Isla Livingston. Mapa topográfico a escala 1:25000. Madrid: Servicio Geográfico del Ejército, 1992. (Map image on p. 55 of the linked study)
 L.L. Ivanov. Antarctica: Livingston Island and Greenwich, Robert, Snow and Smith Islands. Scale 1:120000 topographic map.  Troyan: Manfred Wörner Foundation, 2009.

Gallery

Notes

References
 Cutler Stack. SCAR Composite Antarctic Gazetteer

Rock formations of Livingston Island